Smajli is an Albanian surname. Its literal meaning is "son of Ismail", which is similar to that of the Bosnian surname Smajić and the Turkish family name İsmailoğlu and it may indicate Muslim religious affiliation of its bearer. Notable people with the name include:
 Brikena Smajli (born 1970), Albanian writer
 Dritan Smajli (born 1985), Albanian footballer
 Tringe Smajli (1880–1917), Albanian guerrilla fighter
 Valmir Smajli (born 1998), Kosovar footballer

References

Albanian-language surnames
Patronymic surnames